Abu Dhabi is the capital and the second most populous city of the United Arab Emirates, as well as the capital of the Emirate of Abu Dhabi.

Abu Dhabi may also refer to:

Places 
 Emirate of Abu Dhabi, emirate of the United Arab Emirates
 Abu Dhabi Central Capital District, the municipal region

Music 
 "Abu Dhabi" (Mikolas Josef song), a 2019 song by Czech singer Mikolas Josef
 "Abu Dhabi" (Jain song), 2018 song by Jain on the album Souldier

See also 
 Abu Dhabi International Airport, international airport in Abu Dhabi
 Ubbi dubbi